Clyde Hurle (6 March 1926 – 19 November 2002) was an Australian professional wrestler best known as Kangaroo Kennedy. He had a gimmick which was his golden blond hair and a boomerang. He was a former Australian Heavyweight Champion, defeating Baron Von Heczy for the title on 14 April 1962, and NWA Australasian Heavyweight Champion.

Championships and accomplishments
NWA Australia
Australian Heavyweight Championship (1 time)
Dominion Wrestling Union
NWA Australasian Heavyweight Championship (1 time)

References

External links
Kangaroo Kennedy at OWW.com

1926 births
2002 deaths
Australian male professional wrestlers
Sportspeople from Newcastle, New South Wales
Sportspeople from the Gold Coast, Queensland